Alexandre Yankoff (27 June 1931 – 2 November 2015) was a French hurdler. He competed in the men's 400 metres hurdles at the 1956 Summer Olympics.

References

External links
 

1931 births
2015 deaths
Athletes (track and field) at the 1956 Summer Olympics
French male hurdlers
Olympic athletes of France
People from Nevers
Sportspeople from Nièvre
20th-century French people
21st-century French people